Guadalupe or Guadeloupe may refer to:

Places

Bolivia 
 Guadalupe, Potosí

Brazil 
 Guadalupe, Piauí, a municipality in the state of Piauí
 Guadalupe, Rio de Janeiro, a neighbourhood in the city of Rio de Janeiro

Colombia
 Guadalupe, Antioquia, a municipality and town
 Guadalupe, Huila, a municipality and town
 Guadalupe, Santander, a municipality and town
 Guadalupe Hill, a hill in Bogotá

Costa Rica
 Guadalupe, Costa Rica, a suburb of San José, Costa Rica

El Salvador
 Guadalupe, San Vicente

France
 Guadeloupe, a French overseas department in the Caribbean

Mexico
 Guadalupe, Baja California
 Guadalupe, Chihuahua
 Guadalupe, Nuevo León, part of the metropolitan area of Monterrey

 Guadalupe Etla, Oaxaca
 Guadalupe, Puebla, see Municipalities of Puebla
 Guadalupe, Zacatecas
 Guadalupe de Ramírez, Oaxaca
 Guadalupe y Calvo, Chihuahua
 Villa de Guadalupe, Mexico City, a town near Mexico City, now a suburb incorporated into the city
 Presa de Guadalupe, lake near Cuautitlán Izcalli
 Guadalupe Island, an oceanic island off Baja California

Peru
 Guadalupe, Peru

Philippines
 Guadalupe, Cebu City, a barangay in Carcar, Cebu
 Guadalupe Nuevo and Guadalupe Viejo, two barangays in Makati

Portugal
 Nossa Senhora de Guadalupe, a civil parish in Évora
 Guadalupe (Santa Cruz da Graciosa), a civil parish in the municipality of Santa Cruz da Graciosa, island of Graciosa, Azores

São Tomé and Príncipe
 Guadalupe, São Tomé and Príncipe

Spain
 Guadalupe, Cáceres, a municipality in Extremadura
 Guadalupe, Murcia, a village in the municipality and region of Murcia
 Guadalupe (Spain), a river

United States
 Guadalupe, Arizona
 Guadalupe, California
 Guadalupe County, Colorado Territory
 Guadalupe, Colorado
 Guadalupe County, New Mexico
 Guadalupe County, Texas
 Guadalupe Mountains, in New Mexico and Texas
 Guadalupe Mountains National Park, Texas
 Guadalupe River (California)
 Guadalupe River (Texas)
 Guadalupe-Nipomo Dunes, in California

Ships 
 USS Guadalupe (AO-32), a United States Navy replenishment oiler in commission from 1941 to 1974
 USNS Guadalupe (T-AO-200), a United States Navy fleet replenishment oiler in service since 1992

Other uses 
 Guadalupe (name)
 Guadalupe (film), a 2006 film
 Guadalupe (Mexican TV series), a 1984 Mexican telenovela television series that aired on Canal de las Estrellas
 Guadalupe (U.S. TV series), a 1993 American Spanish-language telenovela television series that was broadcast on Telemundo

See also
 Guadalupe District (disambiguation), several locations
 Guadalupe Municipality (disambiguation), several municipalities
 Sierra de Guadalupe (disambiguation)
 Valle de Guadalupe (disambiguation), several locations
 Our Lady of Guadalupe, the patroness of Mexico, the Americas, and secondary Patroness of the Philippines
 Basilica of Our Lady of Guadalupe in Mexico City
 Our Lady of Guadalupe, Extremadura, Marian shrine in Extremadura, Spain